Sargent Fletcher is a subsidiary company of Cobham plc. which makes aircraft equipment, including aerial refueling systems, external fuel tanks, and special purpose pods.

History
Sargent Fletcher was founded as Fletcher Aviation in 1940 and bought by Cobham in 1994.

According to a 1991 report the company submitted to regional air quality officials, the company's El Monte chrome-plating plant showed the highest cancer-risk level of any business in the San Gabriel Valley. It was later closed in 2010.

Customers
The KC-130J was supposed to be equipped with Flight Refuelling Ltd's Mk32B-901E hose-and-drogue units, but operational problems meant that the aircraft went into production using equipment from Sargent Fletcher instead.

Aircraft using Sargent Fletcher equipment include:

Boeing 707
Dassault Mirage 5
Douglas A-4 Skyhawk
Lockheed Martin F-16 Fighting Falcon
Lockheed Martin F-22 Raptor
Lockheed C-130 Hercules / HC-130 / KC-130 / MC-130
Lockheed L-1011 TriStar
McDonnell Douglas F-15 Eagle
McDonnell Douglas F/A-18 Hornet
McDonnell Douglas KC-10A 
Northrop F-5
Panavia Tornado

References

Aerospace companies of the United States
Companies based in Los Angeles County, California
El Monte, California
Manufacturing companies based in California